Fight CU is the fight song for the Colorado Buffaloes.  The song is usually performed by the Golden Buffalo Marching Band. The lyrics of the song were written by Richard Durnett.

Lyrics
Fight CU down the field,

CU must win

Fight, fight for victory

CU knows no defeat

We'll roll up a mighty score

Never give in

Shoulder to shoulder

We will fight, fight

Fight, fight, fight!

History
The University of Colorado Boulder has had several fight songs that have lost and gained popularity over the years. The oldest, "Glory Colorado", is sung to the tune of "Battle Hymn of the Republic" and has been around nearly as long as the school. Glory Colorado is considered to represent all campuses of the University. "Go Colorado" was originally sung exclusively by the Glee Club at football games, though it is now played and known almost exclusively by members of the Golden Buffalo Marching Band. The most popular of the three fight songs and the most widely recognized is "Fight CU." Originally sung by the football team, the song has gained enough popularity that few people outside the band know that it is not the only fight song of the university. The original version included the line "fight, fight for every yard" but the line was changed to "fight, fight for victory" to allow the song to be used for all sports, not just football.

References

American college songs
College fight songs in the United States
Pac-12 Conference fight songs
Colorado Buffaloes